Seneca is a census-designated place (CDP) in Venango County, Pennsylvania,  United States. As of the 2000 census, the CDP population was 966.

Geography
Seneca is located at  (41.377828, -79.703224).

Demographics

At the 2000 census, there were 966 people, 421 households and 300 families residing in the CDP. The population density was 430.8 people per square mile (166.5/km2). There were 432 housing units at an average density of 192.6/sq mi (74.5/km2). The racial makeup of the CDP was 99.17% White, 0.31% African American, 0.31% Asian, 0.10% from other races, and 0.10% from two or more races. Hispanic or Latino of any race were 0.10% of the population.

There were 421 households, of which 24.0% had children under the age of 18 living with them, 62.9% were married couples living together, 5.0% had a female householder with no husband present, and 28.7% were non-families. 25.7% of all households were made up of individuals, and 13.5% had someone living alone who was 65 years of age or older. The average household size was 2.29 and the average family size was 2.76.

Age distribution was 19.4% under the age of 18, 6.2% from 18 to 24, 23.3% from 25 to 44, 27.7% from 45 to 64, and 23.4% who were 65 years of age or older. The median age was 46 years. For every 100 females, there were 94.4 males. For every 100 females age 18 and over, there were 94.8 males.

The median household income $35,250, and the median family income was $47,083. Males had a median income of $32,750 versus $20,217 for females. The per capita income for the CDP was $18,726. About 3.2% of families and 6.0% of the population were below the poverty line, including 16.8% of those under age 18 and 2.8% of those age 65 or over.

References

 

Census-designated places in Venango County, Pennsylvania
Census-designated places in Pennsylvania